The 2018 FC Atyrau season is the 18th successive season that the club will play in the Kazakhstan Premier League, the highest tier of association football in Kazakhstan.

Season events
On  8 January 2018, Vakhid Masudov was appointed as FC Atyrau's new manager. On 9 April, Masudov left Atyrau by mutual consent, with Adrian Sosnovschi being appointed as Atyrau's new manager on 11 April. Adrian Sosnovschi and his coaching team resigned on 1 July, with Viktor Kumykov being appointed as Atyrau's third manager of the season on 4 July.

Squad

Transfers

Winter

In:

Out:

Summer

In:

Out:

Competitions

Premier League

Results summary

Results by round

Results

League table

Kazakhstan Cup

Final

Squad statistics

Appearances and goals

|-
|colspan="14"|Players away from Atyrau on loan:
|-
|colspan="14"|Players who left Atyrau during the season:

|}

Goal scorers

Disciplinary record

References

External links
 Official website
 Official VK

FC Atyrau seasons
Atyrau